Coalition of Secular and Democratic Syrians or Syrian Coalition of Secular and Democratic Forces (Arabic الائتلاف العلماني الديموقراطي السوري) is the nucleus of a Syrian secular and democratic opposition that appeared during the 2011 Syrian uprising. It was created by the union of a dozen Muslim and Christian, Arab and Kurd parties, who called the minorities of Syria to support the fight against the government of Bashar al-Assad.  The Coalition has also called for military intervention in Syria, under the form of a no-fly zone similar to that of Kosovo, with a safe zone and cities. The president of the coalition, who is also a member of the Syrian National Council, is Randa Kassis.

References

2011 establishments in Syria
Organizations established in 2011
Organizations of the Syrian civil war
Political opposition organizations
Political party alliances in Syria
Syrian opposition